Soulsville is a song written and performed by Isaac Hayes in 1971 for the film Shaft.

Soulsville may also refer to:

 Soulsville (Huey Lewis and the News album), 2010
 Soulsville (Beverley Knight album), 2016
 Soulsville Charter School
 Soulsville U.S.A., a nickname for the former home of the Stax Records studio, now the Stax Museum of American Soul Music

See also
Soulville (disambiguation)